Hindu cosmology is the description of the universe and its states of matter, cycles within time, physical structure, and effects on living entities according to Hindu texts. Hindu cosmology is also intertwined with the idea of a creator who allows the world to exist and take shape.

Matter

All matter is based on three inert gunas (qualities or tendencies):
 sattva (goodness)
 rajas (passion)
 tamas (darkness)

There are three states of the gunas that make up all matter in the universe:
 pradhana (root matter): gunas in an unmixed and unmanifested state (equilibrium).
 prakriti (primal matter): gunas in a mixed and unmanifested state (agitated).
 mahat-tattva (matter or universal womb): gunas in a mixed and manifested state.

Pradhana, which has no consciousness or will to act on its own, is initially agitated by a primal desire to create. The different schools of thought differ in understanding about the ultimate source of that desire and what the gunas are mixed with (eternal elements, time, jiva-atmas).

The manifest material elements (matter) range from the most subtle to the most physical (gross). These material elements cover the individual, spiritual jiva-atmas (embodied souls), allowing them to interact with the material sense objects, such as their temporary material bodies, other conscious bodies, and unconscious objects.

Manifested subtle elements:
 ahamkara (ego)
 buddhi (intelligence)
 citta (mind)

Manifested physical (gross) elements ( pancha bhoota or 5 great elements) and their associated senses and sense organs that manifest:
 space/ether > sound > ear
 air > touch > skin
 fire > sight/form > eye
 water > taste > tongue
 earth > smell > nose

Time

Time is infinite with a cyclic universe, where the current universe was preceded and will be followed by an infinite number of universes. The different states of matter are guided by eternal kala (time), which repeats general events ranging from a moment to the lifespan of the universe, which is cyclically created and destroyed.

The earliest mentions of cosmic cycles in Sanskrit literature are found in the Yuga Purana ( 1st century BCE), the Mahabharata ( 3rd century BCE – 4th century CE), and the Manusmriti ( 2nd – 3rd centuries CE). In the Mahabharata, there are inconsistent names applied to the cycle of creation and destruction, a name theorized as still being formulated, where yuga (generally, an age of time) and kalpa (a day of Brahma) are used, or a day of Brahma, the creator god, or simply referred to as the process of creation and destruction, with kalpa and day of Brahma becoming more prominent in later writings.

Prakriti (primal matter) remains mixed for a maha-kalpa (life of Brahma) of 311.04 trillion years, and is followed by a maha-pralaya (great dissolution) of equal length. The universe (matter) remains manifested for a kalpa (day of Brahma) of 4.32 billion years, where the universe is created at the start and destroyed at the end, only to be recreated at the start of the next kalpa. A kalpa is followed by a pralaya (partial dissolution,  night of Brahma) of equal length, when Brahma and the universe are in an unmanifested state. Each kalpa has 15 manvantara-sandhyas (junctures of great flooding) and 14 manvantaras (age of Manu, progenitor of mankind), with each manvantara lasting for 306.72 million years. Each kalpa has 1,000 and each manvantara has 71 chatur-yugas (epoch,  maha-yuga), with each chatur-yuga lasting for 4.32 million years and divided into four yugas (dharmic ages): Satya Yuga (1,728,000 years), Treta Yuga (1,296,000 years), Dvapara Yuga (864,000 years), and Kali Yuga (432,000 years), of which we are currently in Kali Yuga.

Life

The individual, spiritual jiva-atma (embodied soul) is the life force or consciousness within a living entity. Jivas are eternal; they are not created or destroyed, and are distinctly different from the created unconscious matter. The gunas in their manifest state of matter, cover the jivas in various ways based on each jiva's karma and impressions. This material covering of matter allows the jivas to interact with the material sense objects that make up the material universe, such as their temporary material bodies, other conscious bodies, and unconscious objects.

The material creation is called maya ("that which is not") due to its impermanent (non-eternal), temporary nature of sometimes being manifest and sometimes not. It has been compared to a dream or virtual reality, where the viewer (jiva) has real experiences with objects that will eventually become unreal.

Through the interactions with the material sense objects, a jiva starts to identify the temporary material body as the true self, and in this way becomes influenced and bound by maya perpetually in a conscious state of nescience (ignorance, unawareness, forgetfulness). This conscious state of nescience leads to samsara (cycle of reincarnation), only to end for a jiva when moksha (liberation) is achieved through self-realization (atman-jnana) or remembrance of one's true spiritual self/nature. Taking action to develop this state of awareness of ones true identity, and to understand the illusionary nature of maya is known as striving for moksha. Hindu's believe that dharma is a means to moksha, thus perfecting dharma is one such action. The spiritual practice known as sadhna is another action. The jiva is considered the place where all positive qualities within us are housed, yet remain hidden due to the "layers of maya".

The different schools of thought differ in understanding about the initial event that led to the jivas entering the material creation and the ultimate state of moksha.

Creation and structure
Hinduism is a conglomeration/group of distinct intellectual or philosophical points of view, rather than a rigid common set of beliefs. It includes a range of viewpoints about the origin of life. There is no single story of creation, due to dynamic diversity of Hinduism, and these are derived from various sources like Vedas, some from the Brahmanas, some from Puranas; some are philosophical, based on concepts, and others are narratives. Hindu texts do not provide a single canonical account of the creation; they mention a range of theories of the creation of the world, some of which are apparently contradictory.

Rigveda 
According to Henry White Wallis, the Rigveda and other Vedic texts are full of alternative cosmological theories and curiosity questions. To its numerous open-ended questions, the Vedic texts present a diversity of thought, in verses imbued with symbols and allegory, where in some cases, forces and agencies are clothed with a distinct personality, while in other cases as nature with or without anthropomorphic activity such as forms of mythical sacrifices.

Hiranyagarbha sukta (golden egg) 
Rigveda 10.121 mentions the Hiranyagarbha ("hiranya = golden or radiant" and "garbha = filled / womb") that existed before the creation, as the source of the creation of the Universe, similar to the world egg motif found in the creation myths of many other civilizations.

This metaphor has been interpreted differently by the various later texts. The Samkhya texts state that Purusha and the Prakriti made the embryo, from which the world emerged. In another tradition, the creator god Brahma emerged from the egg and created the world, while in yet another tradition the Brahma himself is the Hiranyagarbha. The nature of the Purusha, the creation of the gods and other details of the embryo creation myth have been described variously by the later Hindu texts.

Purusha Sukta 
The Purusha Sukta (RV 10.90) describes a myth of proto-Indo-European origin, in which the creation arises out of the dismemberment of the Purusha, a primeval cosmic being who is sacrificed by the gods. Purusha is described as all that has ever existed and will ever exist. This being's body was the origin of four different kinds of people: the Brahmin, the Rajanya, the Vaishya, and the Shudra. Viraj, variously interpreted as the mundane egg (see Hiranyagarbha) or the twofold male-female energy, was born from Purusha, and the Purusha was born again from Viraj. The gods then performed a yajna with the Purusha, leading to the creation of the other things in the manifested world from his various body parts and his mind. These things included the animals, the Vedas, the Varnas, the celestial bodies, the air, the sky, the heavens, the earth, the directions, and the Gods Indra and Agni. 

The later texts such as the Puranas identify the Purusha with God. In many Puranic notes, Brahma is the creator god. However, some Puranas also identify Vishnu, Shiva or Devi as the creator.

Nasadiya Sukta 
The Nasadiya Sukta (RV 10.129) takes a near-agnostic stand on the creation of the primordial beings (such as the gods who performed the sacrifice of the Purusha), stating that the gods came into being after the world's creation, and nobody knows when the world first came into being. It asks who created the universe, does anyone really know, and whether it can ever be known. The Nasadiya Sukta states:

Other hymns 
The early hymns of Rigveda also mention Tvastar as the first born creator of the human world.

The Devi sukta (RV 10.125) states a goddess is all, the creator, the created universe, the feeder and the lover of the universe;

Recounting the creation of gods, the Rig Veda does seem to affirm creatio ex nihilo. Rig Veda 10.72 states: RV 10.72 states:

RV 1.24 asks, "these stars, which are set on high, and appear at night, whither do they go in the daytime?" RV 10.88 wonders, "how many fires are there, how many suns, how many dawns, how many waters? I am not posing an awkward question for you fathers; I ask you, poets, only to find out?"

Brahmanas 

The Shatapatha Brahmana mentions a story of creation, in which the Prajapati performs tapas to reproduce himself. He releases the waters and enters them in the form of an egg that evolves into the cosmos. The Prajapati emerged from the golden egg, and created the earth, the middle regions and the sky. With further tapas, he created the devas. He also created the asuras, and the darkness came into the being. It also contains a story similar to the other great flood stories. After the great flood, Manu the only surviving human, offers a sacrifice from which Ida is born. From her, the existing human race comes into the being.

The Shatapatha Brahmana states that the current human generation descends from Manu, the only man who survived a great deluge after being warned by the God. This legend is comparable to the other flood legends, such as the story of the Noah's Ark mentioned in the Bible and the Quran.

Upanishads 
The Aitareya Upanishad (3.4.1) mentions that only the "Atman" (the Self) existed in the beginning. The Self created the heaven (Ambhas), the sky (Marikis), the earth (Mara) and the underworld (Ap). He then formed the Purusha from the water. He also created the speech, the fire, the prana (breath of life), the air and the various senses, the directions, the trees, the mind, the moon and other things.

The Brihadaranyaka Upanishad (1.4) mentions that in the beginning, only the Atman existed as the Purusha. Feeling lonely, the Purusha divided itself into two parts: male ("pati") and female ("patni"). The men were born when the male embraced the female. The female thought "how can he embrace me, after having produced me from himself? I shall hide myself." She then became a cow to hide herself, but the male became a bull and embraced her. Thus the cows were born. Similarly, everything that exists in pairs, was created. Next, the Purusha created the fire, the soma and the immortal gods (the devas) from his better part. He also created the various powers of the gods, the different classes, the dharma (law or duty) and so on. The Taittiriya Upanishad states that the being (sat) was created from the non-being. The Being later became the Atman (2.7.1), and then created the worlds (1.1.1). The Chhandogya states that the Brahma creates, sustains and destroys the world. A similar perspective is also portrayed in the Mundak Upanishad verse 2.1.10, which states "puruṣa evedaṃ viśvaṃ karma tapo brahma parāmṛtam", meaning "out of this Purush, everything is born, and by knowing him, everything becomes known"

Puranas 

The Puranas genre of Indian literature, found in Hinduism and Jainism, contain a section on cosmology and cosmogony as a requirement. There are dozens of different Mahapuranas and Upapuranas, each with its own theory integrated into a proposed human history consisting of solar and lunar dynasties. Some are similar to Indo-European creation myths, while others are novel. One cosmology, shared by Hindu, Buddhist and Jain texts involves Mount Meru, with stars and sun moving around it using Dhruva (North Star) as the focal reference. According to Annette Wilke and Oliver Moebus, the diversity of cosmology theories in Hinduism may reflect its tendency to not reject new ideas and empirical observations as they became available, but to adapt and integrate them creatively.

In the later Puranic texts, the creator god Brahma is described as performing the act of "creation", or more specifically of "propagating life within the universe". Some texts consider him equivalent to the Hiranyagarbha or the Purusha, while others state that he arose out of these. Brahma is a part of the trimurti of gods that also includes Vishnu and Shiva, who are responsible for "preservation" and "destruction" (of the universe) respectively.

In Garuda Purana, there was nothing in the universe except Brahman. The universe became an expanse of water, and in that Vishnu was born in the golden egg. He created Brahma with four faces. Brahma then created the devas, asuras, pitris and manushas. He also created the rakshasas, yakshas, and gandharvas. Other creatures came from the various parts of his body (e.g. snakes from his hair, sheep from his chest, goats from his mouth, cows from his stomach, others from his feet). His body hair became herbs. The four varnas came from his body parts and the four Vedas from his mouths. He created several sons from his mind: Daksha, Daksha's wife, Manu Svaymbhuva, his wife Shatarupta and the rishi Kashypa. Kashypata married thirteen of Daksha's daughters and all the devas and the creatures were born through them. Other Puranas and the Manu Smriti mention several variations of this theory.

In Vishnu Purana, the Purusha is same as the creator deity Brahma, and is a part of Vishnu. The Shaivite texts mention the Hiranyagarbha as a creation of Shiva. According to the Devi-Bhagavata Purana Purusha and Prakriti emerged together and formed the Brahman, the supreme universal spirit that is the origin and support of the universe.

Brahmanda (cosmic egg) 
According to Richard L. Thompson, the Bhagavata Purana presents a geocentric model of our Brahmanda (cosmic egg or universe), where our Bhu-mandala disk, equal in diameter to our Brahmanda, has a diameter of 500 million yojanas (trad. 8 miles each), which equals around 4 billion miles or more, a size far too small for the universe of stars and galaxies, but in the right range for the Solar System. In addition, the Bhagavata Purana and other Puranas speak of a multiplicity of universes, or Brahmandas, each covered by seven-fold layers with an aggregate thickness of over ten million times its diameter (5x1015 yojanas ≈ 6,804+ light-years in diameter). The Jyotisha Shastras, Surya Siddhanta, and Siddhānta Shiromani give the Brahmanda an enlarged radius of about 5,000 light years. Finally, the Mahabharata refers to stars as large, self-luminous objects that seem small because of their great distance, and that the Sun and Moon cannot be seen if one travels to those distant stars. Thompson notes that Bhu-mandala can be interpreted as a map of the geocentric orbits of the Sun and the five planets, Mercury through Saturn, and this map becomes highly accurate if we adjust the length of the yojana to about 8.5 miles.

Brahma, the first born and secondary creator, during the start of his kalpa, divides the Brahmanda (cosmic egg or universe), first into three, later into fourteen lokas (planes or realms)—sometimes grouped into heavenly, earthly and hellish planes—and creates the first living entities to multiply and fill the universe. Some Puranas describe innumerable universes existing simultaneously with different sizes and Brahmas, each manifesting and unmanifesting at the same time.

Indian philosophy 
The Samkhya texts state that there are two distinct fundamental eternal entities: the Purusha and the Prakriti. The Prakriti has three qualities: sattva (purity or preservation), rajas (creation) and tamas (darkness or destruction). When the equilibrium between these qualities is broken, the act of creation starts. Rajas quality leads to creation.

Advaita Vedanta states that the creation arises from Brahman, but it is illusory and has no reality. The Mundak Upanishad verse 2.2.11 also states "brahmaivedamamṛtaṃ purastādbrahma paścādbrahma dakṣiṇataścottareṇa adhaścordhvaṃ ca prasṛtaṃ brahmaivedaṃ viśvamidaṃ variṣṭham", meaning "All this before is immortal Brahman; certainly all behind is Brahman; all to the south and to the north; all bellow and all alone stretched out, all this is certainly Brahman", and suggests that Brahma is present throughout that creation.

Cycles of creation and destruction
Many Hindu texts mention the cycle of creation and destruction. According to the Upanishads, the universe and the Earth, along with humans and other creatures, undergo repeated cycles of creation and destruction (pralaya). A variety of myths exist regarding the specifics of the process, but in general the Hindu view of the cosmos is as eternal and cyclic. The later puranic view also asserts that the universe is created, destroyed, and re-created in an eternally repetitive series of cycles. In Hindu cosmology, age of earth is about 4,320,000,000 years (one day of Brahma that is 1000 times of sum of 4 yugas in years, the creator or kalpa) and is then destroyed by fire or water elements. At this point, Brahma rests for one night, just as long as the day. This process, called pralaya (cataclysm), repeats for 100 Brahma years (311 trillion, 40 billion human years) that represents Brahma's lifespan.

Lokas
Deborah Soifer describes the development of the concept of lokas as follows:

In the Brahmanda Purana, as well as Bhagavata Purana (2.5), fourteen lokas (planes) are described, consist of seven higher (Vyahrtis) and seven lower (Patalas) lokas.

However, other Puranas give different version of this cosmology and associated myths.

Multiple universes
The Hindu texts describe innumerable universes existing all at the same time moving around like atoms, each with its own Brahma, Vishnu, and Shiva.

See also

Notes

References

Bibliography

External links

 
Religious cosmologies
Hindu creation myths
el:Κοσμολογία#Ινδουιστική Κοσμολογία
th:พรหมภูมิ